Ijé or Ijé: The Journey is a 2010 Nigerian drama film directed by Chineze Anyaene and starring Omotola Jalade-Ekeinde, Genevieve Nnaji, and Odalys García.

Plot
Chioma (Genevieve Nnaji) travels from Nigeria to the United States to aide her sister Anya (Omotola Jalade-Ekeinde) who is being charged with the murder of three men including her own husband.

Cast
Omotola Jalade-Ekeinde
Genevieve Nnaji
Odalys García
Jeff Swarthout
Clem Ohameze
Ulrich Que
Jon Woodward

Reception
Nollywood Reinvented rated the movie 68% and praised its ability to touch on a diversity of topics.

The Independent wrote:
"Ijé is an unsparing, outsider’s portrayal of America’s social prejudices, one that Hollywood films cannot construct themselves. Anyaene nails social comedy too; my favourite exchange involves the protagonist Chioma investigating an affluent white American home. A petite homeowner swings open the door and chirps, “We already give to the Jolie-Pitt fund every year…thank you though!” ". Film critic Gbenga Awomodu, reviewing for CP Africa praised the cinematography and acting, remarking that the film "brings to the fore some important themes in today's world, including love, racism, culture, stigma and life as an immigrant in a foreign country". He further emphasised that the film is illustrative of culture clashes between Nigeria and the US in attitude towards rape, and the culture of shame, silence and stigma associated with it.

The film garnered the Award of Excellence at the Canada International Film Festival, the Golden Ace Award at the Las Vegas International Film Festival, the Silver Palm Award at the Mexico International Film Festival, the Melvin van Peebles Award at the San Francisco Black Festival,  and the Festival Prize for Best International Student at Swansea Bay Film Festival.

Box office 
Ijé became the highest grossing Nigerian film, a record it held for four years, until it was overtaken in 2014 by Half of a Yellow Sun (2013).

See also
 List of Nigerian films of 2010

References

External links
 
 Official Website

2010 films
Nigerian crime drama films
English-language Nigerian films
2010 crime drama films
Films about rape
Films shot in Los Angeles
Films set in the United States
American crime drama films
2010s English-language films
Igbo-language films
Nigerian drama films
2010s American films